The Fighting Heart is a 1919 American short silent Western film directed by B. Reeves Eason.

Cast
 Jack Perrin
 Hoot Gibson
 Josephine Hill
 William Pathe
 Magda Lane
 Laura Trainor
 Leo Pattee

See also
 List of American films of 1919
 Hoot Gibson filmography

External links
 

1919 films
1919 Western (genre) films
1919 short films
American silent short films
American black-and-white films
Films directed by B. Reeves Eason
Silent American Western (genre) films
Universal Pictures short films
1910s American films
1910s English-language films